The 2018 World Cup was the 21st edition of the FIFA senior men's association football tournament.

2018 World Cup may also refer to:

Association football
2018 FIFA U-20 Women's World Cup
2018 FIFA U-17 Women's World Cup
2018 FIFA Club World Cup

Basketball
2018 FIBA 3x3 World Cup
2018 FIBA Under-17 Basketball World Cup
2018 FIBA Women's Basketball World Cup

Cycling
2017–18 UCI Cyclo-cross World Cup
2017–18 UCI Track Cycling World Cup
2018 UCI Mountain Bike World Cup

Field hockey
2018 Men's Hockey World Cup
2018 Women's Hockey World Cup

Table tennis
2018 ITTF Team World Cup
2018 ITTF Men's World Cup
2018 ITTF Women's World Cup

Winter sports
2017–18 FIS Alpine Ski World Cup
2017–18 FIS Cross-Country World Cup
2017–18 FIS Freestyle Ski World Cup
2017–18 FIS Nordic Combined World Cup
2017–18 FIS Ski Jumping World Cup
2017–18 FIS Snowboard World Cup
2017–18 ISU Short Track Speed Skating World Cup
2017–18 ISU Speed Skating World Cup
2017–18 Biathlon World Cup
2017–18 Bobsleigh World Cup
2017–18 Luge World Cup
2017–18 Skeleton World Cup

Other sports
2018 Athletics World Cup
2018 IAAF Continental Cup
2018 Canoe Slalom World Cup
2018 Cricket World Cup Qualifier
2018 FIG Artistic Gymnastics World Cup Series
2018 FIG Rhythmic Gymnastics World Cup Series
2018 ISSF World Cup
2018 Rugby World Cup Sevens
2018 PDC World Cup of Darts
2018 World Cup of Pool